Paul Caponigro (born December 7, 1932), is an American photographer from Boston, Massachusetts.

Early life 
Caponigro started having interests in photography at age 13. However, he also had a strong passion in music and began to study music at Boston University College of Music in 1950, before eventually deciding to focus on studying photography at the California School of Fine Art.

Photography career 
Caponigro studied with Minor White and has been awarded two Guggenheim Fellowships and three grants from the NEA. His best known photographs are Running White Deer and Galaxy Apple. His subject matter includes landscape and still life, taking an interest in natural forms. He is best known for his landscape works and for the mystical and spiritual qualities of his work.  He is often regarded as one of America's foremost landscape photographers.
Caponigro's first one-man exhibition took place at the George Eastman House in 1958.  In the 1960s Caponigro taught photography part-time at Boston University while consulting the Polaroid Corporation on various technical research. Caponigro lived in El Rancho de San Sebastian during his time in New Mexico from 1973 to 1993.

In 1971, his work was exhibited in group exhibition "Le Groupe Libre Expression : Expo 5", presented by Jean-Claude Gautrand, at Les Rencontres d'Arles festival, France.

Caponigro's work is included in the collections of the Guggenheim, Whitney, Norton Simon Museum, New Mexico Museum of Art and San Francisco Museum of Modern Art.

He was awarded The Royal Photographic Society's Centenary Medal and Honorary Fellowship (HonFRPS) in recognition of a sustained, significant contribution to the art of photography in 2001.

Caponigro is a dedicated pianist and considers his training with music to be essential to his photographic imagery.

His son, John Paul Caponigro, is a digital photographic artist.

Quotes
 “I often see the materials of photography as being a type of terrain. Emulsions, liquid developers, silver salts, and fixers interact, and I construct a landscape that I need to first explore in my mind’s eye if I am to make it manifest as an artful image in silver.”
 "Photography is a medium, a language, through which I might come to experience directly, live more closely with, the interaction between myself and nature."
 "At the root of creativity is an impulse to understand, to make sense of random and often unrelated details. For me, photography provides an intersection of time, space, light, and emotional stance. One needs to be still enough, observant enough, and aware enough to recognize the life of the materials, to be able to 'hear through the eyes'."
 "It's one thing to make a picture of what a person looks like, it's another thing to make a portrait of who they are."
 "In my years of photography I have learned that many things can be sensed, seen, shaped or resolved in a realm of quiet, well in advance of, or between, the actual clicking of shutters and the sloshing of films and papers in chemical solutions. I work to attain “a state of heart”, a gentle space offering inspirational substance that could purify one's vision. Photography, like music, must be born in the unmanifest world of spirit."

Books
 Veiled Yet Revealed: Masterworks from Fifty Years
 Paul Caponigro: Masterworks of Forty Years
 Paul Caponigro - New England Days
 Paul Caponigro: Of the Earth, Still Life Studies 2001~2004
 Megaliths.
 New England Days. 
 Landscape. 
 The Wise Silence.

References

External links
 Caponigro, Galaxy Apple, 1964
Paul Caponigro, Running White Deer
 Caponigro Still-lives, 2001-2004

American photographers
1932 births
Living people